David Finn (August 30, 1921 – October 18, 2021) was an American public relations executive, photographer, and historian of sculpture. He is known in public relations as a co-founder of the Ruder Finn firm. In addition to his career in public relations, Finn was a lifelong historian and photographer of sculpture.

Early life
Finn was born David Finkelstein in New York City on August 30, 1921.  His father, Jonathan (1885–1971), worked as a writer; his mother, Sadie (Borgenicht), created dresses for children.  His father, who employed Finn as his pen name, changed the family name when David was in high school.  Finn enrolled in the City College of New York in 1939 and graduated with a bachelor's degree four years later.  He then served briefly in the Army Air Forces during World War II.

Career
Finn co-founded the Ruder Finn public relations agency in 1948 along with Bill Ruder. Over the years, his clients  included Perry Como, John D. Rockefeller III, and John F. Kennedy, among many others. Ruder Finn has also represented many Fortune 500 companies, universities, not-for-profit organizations, and foreign governments.

Historian of sculpture 
Finn was also an influential historian, author and photographer of sculpture. Besides contributing his photography to books by art historians, he wrote articles about sculpture for the Congressional newspaper Roll Call and the National Sculpture Society's quarterly journal Sculpture Review, which he headed as editor-in-chief during the 1990s. His photographs have appeared in over 100 books on the history of sculpture, many of which he authored. Finn's photographs of sculpture have been exhibited at the Metropolitan Museum of Art, the Italian Academy for Advanced Studies in America at Columbia University, L'Orangerie in Paris, the American Cultural Center in Madrid, the Art Gallery of Ontario, and the Municipal Art Society in New York.

Finn applied an artistic style to his photographs of sculpture. He employed raking light and high-contrast black and white to emphasize the drama and three-dimensionality of sculpture. In addition to overall shots, he often focused on close-ups and details, which allowed him to isolate and abstract small sections of his subjects. This idiosyncratic style earned him favor with contemporary sculptors like Henry Moore, whose work Finn photographed extensively.

David Finn Archive 
Finn donated his archive of photographs to the Department of Image Collections, National Gallery of Art Library, Washington, DC in 2016, where it contributes to the department's goal of providing a visual record for the study of art. The David Finn Archive includes over 140,000 images in various forms, including photographic prints, negatives, and transparencies. The subjects represented in the archive span the history of sculpture and range from figural to abstract. Finn photographed both Western and non-Western sculpture, including major works from the European canon from the 12th to the 21st centuries, and examples of sculpture from Mesoamerican, Oceanic, and many other traditions.

Finn photographed the works of important contemporary sculptors, such as Henry Moore and Eduardo Chillida.  He was noted for capturing well-known sculptures from novel angles, like many of his in situ photographs of monumental sculpture.  The collection includes many of the original photographs that Finn used for his publications on various topics related to sculptural history. Much of the collection is digitized and available for viewing at the Department of Image Collections, National Gallery of Art Library website.

Personal life
Finn married Laura Zeisler in 1945.  She was classmates at Hunter College with his younger sister, Helen.  They remained married until his death.  Together, they had four children: Kathy, Dena, Amy, and Peter.

Finn died at the age of 100 on October 18, 2021, at his home in New Rochelle, New York.

Gallery 
Photographs by David Finn in the David Finn Archive, National Gallery of Art Library, Washington, DC.

Selected bibliography 

 Hartt, Frederick. Michelangelo's three pietàs: photographic study. With photography by David Finn. New York: H. N. Abrams, 1975. 
 Finn, David. Henry Moore: sculpture and environment. With photography by David Finn, foreword by Kenneth Clark and commentaries by Henry Moore. New York: H. N. Abrams, 1976.
 Clark, Kenneth. The Florence Baptistry Doors. With photography by David Finn. New York: A Studio Book from Viking Press, 1980. 
 Pieper, Paul. Heinrich Brabender: Ein Bildhauer der Spätgotik in Münster. With photography by David Finn and an introduction by Henry Moore.  Münster: Coppenrath, 1984. 
 Wilkinson, Burke. Uncommon clay: the life and works of Augustus Saint Gaudens. With photography by David Finn. San Diego: Harcourt Brace Jovanovich. 1985. 
 Finn, David. How to Look at Sculpture. With photography by David Finn. New York: Abrams, 1989. 
 Finn, David. How to Visit a Museum. With photography by David Finn. New York: Abrams, 1985. 
 McCue, George. Sculpture City, St. Louis: public sculpture in the "Gateway to the West." With photography by David Finn and Amy Binder. New York: Hudson Hills Press, 1988. 
 Morand, Kathleen. Claus Sluter, artist at the Court of Burgundy. With photography by David Finn. Austin: University of Texas Press, 1991. 
 Reynolds, Donald Martin. Masters of American sculpture: the figurative tradition from the American renaissance to the millennium. With photography by David Finn. New York: Abbeville Press, 1993. 
 Finn, David. How to Look at Photographs. With photography by David Finn. New York: Abrams, 1994. 
 Avery, Charles. Bernini: Genius of the Baroque. With photography by David Finn. Boston: Little, Brown and Company, 1997. 
 Chillida, Eduardo, Giovanni Carandente and Dena Merriam. Eduardo Chillida. With photography by David Finn and translations by Richard Lewis-Rees. Cologne, Germany: Könemann, 1999. 
 Finn, David. How to Look at Everything. With photography by David Finn. New York: Abrams, 2000. 
 Finn, David. 20th-century American sculpture in the White House garden. With photography by David Finn, a foreword by Hillary Rodham Clinton, and an essay by Betty C. Monkman. New York: Abrams, 2000. 
 Finn, David, and Susan Joy Slack. Sculpture at the Corcoran. With photography by David Finn, and foreword by David C. Levy. New York: Ruder-Finn Press, 2002. 
 Moskowitz, Anita Fiderer. The façade reliefs of Orvieto Cathedral. With photography by David Finn. London: Harvey Miller, 2009.

Citations

External links 
 ©David Finn Archive, Department of Image Collections, National Gallery of Art Library, Washington, DC.
The J. Paul Getty Museum's Collection of Finn photographs.

1921 births
2021 deaths
20th-century American photographers
21st-century American photographers
American art historians
American centenarians
United States Army Air Forces personnel of World War II
American public relations people
Men centenarians